Richard Roy "Dick" Eardley (December 23, 1928 – June 30, 2012) served three terms as mayor of Boise, Idaho, from 1974 to 1986.

Eardley served as mayor for a total of 12 years, longer than anyone else in Boise history until Dave Bieter won a fourth consecutive four-year term in 2015. In city history, only Eardley and Bieter have won three consecutive four-year terms as mayor. Eardley was re-elected in 1977 and 1981.

Born in Denver, Colorado, Eardley moved with his family to Baker, Oregon, as a youth and graduated from Baker High School in 1947.  He began his career in journalism and television and radio broadcasting, first at the weekly Record Courier newspaper KBKR radio in Baker. He and his wife Pat were married in 1950, and they moved to Boise five years later, where he worked for the Idaho Statesman newspaper (1955–58) and KBOI-TV and radio (1958–74) in news and sports. Eardley was elected to the Boise City Council in 1969 and served four years before being elected mayor in 1973.

References

External links
Mayors of Boise - Past and Present
Idaho State Historical Society Reference Series, Corrected List of Mayors, 1867-1996
Obituary
The History of Idaho Broadcasting, Inc.

Mayors of Boise, Idaho
1928 births
2012 deaths
Idaho city council members